better known by her ring name  is a Japanese professional wrestler currently working for the Japanese promotion World Wonder Ring Stardom where she is the current Future of Stardom Champion in her first reign.

Professional wrestling career

Independent circuit (2020–present)
Sourei is known for her work in the Japanese independent scene. She took part of the 2021 edition of the Young Block Oh! Oh! division of Pro Wrestling Wave's Catch the Wave tournament where she ended on the second place of the Block A with a total score of tying give points with the winner Tomoka Inaba and also against Momo Kohgo and Shizuku Tsukata. She once competed in Ice Ribbon at New Ice Ribbon #1152 In 176BOX on October 17, 2021, where she teamed up with Akane Fujita in a losing effort against Thekla and Misa Matsui. On the third night of Sendai Girls' Pro Wrestling's Keep Burning show on October 21, 2021, Sourei teamed up with Ayame Sasamura in a losing effort against Team 200kg (Chihiro Hashimoto and Yuu).

Actwres girl'Z (2020–2021)
Sourei made her professional wrestling debut on August 14, 2020, where she fell short to Noki-A at AWG Act In Korakuen Hall, an event promoted by Actwres girl'Z.

World Wonder Ring Stardom (2022–present)
Sourei debuted in World Wonder Ring Stardom on the first night of the Stardom World Climax 2022 from March 26, where she was announced as the first member of Syuri's newly created stable God's Eye. She wrestled her first match in the promotion on April 3, 2022, where she fell short to Syuri in the first rounds of the 2022 Cinderella Tournament. At Stardom Golden Week Fight Tour on May 5, 2022, Sourei teamed up with fellow stablemates Syuri, Konami and Mirai to defeat Donna Del Mondo's Giulia, Himeka, Natsupoi and Mai Sakurai in an eight-woman elimination tag team match. At Stardom New Blood 2 on May 13, 2022, she teamed up with Mirai to defeat Waka Tsukiyama and Momoka Hanazono. At Stardom Flashing Champions on May 28, 2022, she teamed up with Rina and Hina in a losing effort against Stars (Saya Iida & Momo Kohgo) and Lady C. At Stardom Fight in the Top on June 26, 2022, Sourei teamed up with Syuri and Mirai and unsuccessfully challenged the titleholders Saki Kashima, Momo Watanabe and Starlight Kid of Oedo Tai and Donna Del Mondo's Giulia, Maika and Mai Sakurai for the Artist of Stardom Championship. Sourei qualified for the Stardom 5 Star Grand Prix 2022 tournament by winning a qualifier block league where she scored a total of eight points by going against Miyu Amasaki, Momo Kohgo, Rina and Waka Tsukiyama. At Stardom New Blood 5 on October 9, 2022, Sourei defeated Hanan to win the Future of Stardom Championship.

Championships and accomplishments
World Wonder Ring Stardom
 Future of Stardom Championship (1 time, current)

References

1997 births
Living people
Japanese female professional wrestlers
21st-century professional wrestlers
People from Fukushima Prefecture
Sportspeople from Fukushima Prefecture